Edward Cameron Dimock Jr. (March 18, 1929  January 11, 2001) was an American author, linguist, scholar of Asian studies and emeritus professor at the University of Chicago. He is known for his contribution to Indian studies such as Bengali literature and South Asian civilizations. He also conducted research on religion in the mid-1950's and introduced Bengal studies to the American academy.

Biography

Education 
He was born on March 18, 1929, in Roslindale, Massachusetts. In 1946, he graduated from Roxbury Latin School. In 1954, he became an ordained minister after obtaining a Masters of Sacred Theology. In 1959, he went to Yale University and Harvard Divinity School where he obtained his Ph.D.

Career 
He started his career as an assistant professor of linguistics and Asian languages at the faculty of the University of Chicago where he taught for 35 years. He played a central role at the Chicago University for introducing the department of South Asian languages and civilizations, for which he was promoted to the rank of professor in 1966. In the mid-1950's, he travelled to India along with his family to conduct research on religion. After traveling to India, he published several scholarly books, including Mr. Dimock Explores the Mysteries of the East (Algonquin, 1999), consisting a detailed account of his personal analysis and experiences in India.

His other scholarly publications include The Thief of Love: Bengali Tales from Court to Village, The Place of the Hidden Moon: Erotic Mysticism in the Vaisnava-Sahajiya Cult of Bengal, and The Caitanya-Caritamrta of Krsnadasa Kaviraja  among others.

He served president of the American Institute of Indian Studies from 1972 to 1986. In 1962, he along with Milton Singer played significant role with the help of W. Norman Brown to establish Indian studies institute at the University of Pennsylvania which was later shifted to University of Chicago in 1972.

He retired in November 1993 and then moved to Centerville, Massachusetts, with his wife.

Death 
He died on January 11, 2001, from cancer. He is survived by two daughters, three sons and a brother, George of Harvard.

Awards and honours 
He received various literary awards over the course of his career, including the government of India's highest honorary title, the Desikottama, in 1992 which was awarded him for his contribution to Bengali literature. He also received literary honour by the Sahitya Akademi and was elected to the Sahitya Akademi Fellowship from 1929-2001.

Publications

References

External links 
 Contributor profile of Edward C. Dimock at Encyclopædia Britannica

 

1929 births
2001 deaths
Roxbury Latin School alumni
Harvard Divinity School alumni
University of Chicago Divinity School faculty
Writers from Boston
Recipients of the Sahitya Akademi Fellowship